Beale Street Mama is a 1923 popular song by J. Russell Robinson and Roy Turk and a 1946 film with an African-American cast named for the song.  An early jazz standard, the song was recorded by Bessie Smith, Ted Lewis, Fletcher Henderson, Cab Calloway, and many others.

The 1946 film Beale Street Mama was named after the song. A race film, it was directed by and stars Spencer Williams. It was distributed by Sack Amusement Enterprises.

The film is set in Memphis, Tennessee, and focuses on a street sweeper who comes upon a large parcel of money. He uses the newly acquired wealth to go on a spending spree, with the hope of getting back at an old girlfriend who dumped him for another man. However, complications arise when it is discovered the money is counterfeit.

No copyright was filed for Beale Street Mama, which makes the production a public domain film.

Cast
The cast includes:
July Jones
Spencer Williams
Rosalie Larrimore

See also
 List of films in the public domain in the United States

References

External links
 

1946 films
1946 musical comedy films
1940s English-language films
American black-and-white films
African-American musical comedy films
Films directed by Spencer Williams
Race films
1940s American films